Poecilolepis is a genus of South African plants in the tribe Astereae within the family Asteraceae.

 Species
 Poecilolepis ficoidea (DC.) Grau
 Poecilolepis maritima (Bolus) Grau

References

Asteraceae genera
Astereae
Endemic flora of South Africa